The collared nightjar (Gactornis enarratus) is a species of nightjar in the family Caprimulgidae. It is endemic to Madagascar.

Its natural habitats are subtropical or tropical moist lowland forest and subtropical or tropical mangrove forest.

References

Han, K.-L., M.B. Robbins, and M.J. Braun. 2010. A multi-gene estimate of phylogeny in the nightjars and nighthawks (Caprimulgidae). Molecular Phylogenetics and Evolution 55:443-453.

collared nightjar
Endemic birds of Madagascar
collared nightjar
collared nightjar
Taxonomy articles created by Polbot